Charles William "Jack" Harper (April 2, 1878 – September 30, 1950) was a pitcher in Major League Baseball. He pitched eight seasons in the majors, from 1899 to 1906.

Harper started his professional baseball career in 1898. After a short stint with the Cleveland Spiders, he had a good season with the Fort Wayne Indians of the Interstate League in 1900 (going 20-15). This got him into the majors for good.

Over the next few seasons, Harper jumped from league to league, finally settling in with the Cincinnati Reds. He had his best season in 1904, when he went 23–9 with a 2.30 earned run average.

On May 30, 1904, Harper hit Chicago Cubs first baseman Frank Chance three times in one game, the last of which knocked Chance out cold. By 1906, Chance had become the manager of the Cubs, and Harper was struggling on the mound. Chance traded for Harper, cut his salary by two-thirds, and sat him on the bench for the entire season.

At that time, organized baseball had the reserve clause; Harper had to pitch for the Cubs or no team at all. He never played professional baseball again.

See also
 List of Cincinnati Reds Opening Day starting pitchers

References

External links

1878 births
1950 deaths
Major League Baseball pitchers
19th-century baseball players
Baseball players from Pennsylvania
Cleveland Spiders players
St. Louis Cardinals players
St. Louis Browns players
Cincinnati Reds players
Chicago Cubs players
Montgomery Senators players
Fort Wayne Indians players